Garner is a city in and the county seat of Hancock County, Iowa, United States. The population was 3,065 in the 2020 census, an increase from 2,922 in 2000.

History
Garner was named after Col. W. W. Garner, a civil engineer on the Chicago, Milwaukee & St. Paul Railroad. In 1870, Garner was platted by the Chicago, Milwaukee and St. Paul Railway and was incorporated in 1881 with a population of 321 at that time. In the 1880s, the Duesenberg brothers, who later went on to build the Duesenberg automobile, operated  a bicycle sales and repair business in Garner.

In the early days of Hancock County the court house was located approximately one mile south of Garner in what was known as Concord.  The Concord Court House was platted on April 9, 1859, on a lot known as "the Court Square in a village known as Amsterdam but apparently never built.  Later, on November 4, 1865, a site for the county seat was proposed.  Soon after, John Maben, under the auspices of the Board of Supervisors built two small wooden buildings in an area they called "Hancock Center."  That building was replaced by a brick building in 1869.  That court house continued as the county seat until 1899 when a new court house was built in Garner.  In 1898 the town of Britt located a few miles to the west launched a campaign to relocate the County Seat to their town; a plan that was never instituted after some legal intervention by a group of attorneys.  Subsequently building of the "Klondike" railroad that ran through Garner resulted in the building of a new courthouse with the laying of the cornerstone on June 8, 1899,  That regal building continues to serve the people of Hancock County to this day.

In 1895 the famous evangelist Billy Sunday held his first revival meeting at Garner, Iowa; nearly 100 persons accepted Christ during the week of meetings. Each year Garner celebrates "Duesey Days."   The town celebration gets its name from Frederick and August Duesenberg.  The Duesenberg brothers had their meager beginning in a bicycle shop on Main Street in Garner but went on to found Duesenberg Motors Company (sometimes referred to as "Duesy"), an American manufacturer of race cars and luxury automobiles.

Geography

Demographics

2010 census
At the 2010 census there were 3,129 people in 1,301 households, including 881 families, in the city. The racial makeup of the city was 97.3% White, 0.6% African American, 0.3% Asian, 0.4% from other races, and 1.3% from two or more races. Hispanic or Latino of any race were 2.0%.

Of the 1,301 households 30.8% had children under the age of 18 living with them, 57.0% were married couples living together, 7.6% had a female householder with no husband present, 3.2% had a male householder with no wife present, and 32.3% were non-families. 29.0% of households were one person and 16% were one person aged 65 or older. The average household size was 2.37 and the average family size was 2.91.

The median age was 41.6 years. 25.6% of residents were under the age of 18; 5.3% were between the ages of 18 and 24; 22.4% were from 25 to 44; 27.3% were from 45 to 64; and 19.5% were 65 or older. The gender makeup of the city was 48.6% male and 51.4% female.

2000 census
At the 2000 census there were 2,922 people in 1,192 households, including 822 families, in the city. The racial makeup of the city was 98.97% White, 0.03% African American, 0.38% Asian, 0.07% Pacific Islander, 0.21% from other races, and 0.34% from two or more races. Hispanic or Latino of any race were 0.72%.

Of the 1,192 households 33.5% had children under the age of 18 living with them, 59.0% were married couples living together, 7.0% had a female householder with no husband present, and 31.0% were non-families. 28.7% of households were one person and 16.6% were one person aged 65 or older. The average household size was 2.41 and the average family size was 2.95.

Age spread: 25.8% under the age of 18, 7.3% from 18 to 24, 25.1% from 25 to 44, 23.1% from 45 to 64, and 18.8% 65 or older. The median age was 40 years. For every 100 females, there were 90.6 males. For every 100 females age 18 and over, there were 89.6 males.

The median household income was $39,750 and the median family income  was $48,514. Males had a median income of $32,813 versus $19,741 for females. The per capita income for the city was $18,976. About 4.7% of families and 5.4% of the population were below the poverty line, including 6.8% of those under age 18 and 9.1% of those age 65 or over.

Manufacturing 
Garner is home to three  manufacturing companies.  Stellar Industries is a manufacturer of mechanics trucks, telescopic service cranes, hooklifts and tire service truck packages.  Iowa Mold Tooling Company Inc. designs and manufactures mechanics trucks, lube trucks, tire trucks, air compressor and truck mounted cranes. Garner also has a variety of other small manufacturing companies.

Education
Garner is a part of the Garner–Hayfield–Ventura Community School District, which was established on July 1, 2015, with the merger of the Garner–Hayfield and Ventura Community School Districts.

Notable people

 Alvin Baldus (1926–2017) U.S. Representative for Wisconsin and member of the Wisconsin State Assembly
 Fred (1876–1932) and August Duesenberg (1879–1955) automobile manufacturers
 Walter E. Edelen (1911–1991), Iowa businessman and legislator
 Dennis Hejlik, lieutenant general in the United States Marine Corps
 Henry Rayhons (born 1936) Iowa State Representative from the 11th District
William Ashley "Billy" Sunday (1862–1935), professional baseball player who became the most celebrated and influential American evangelist during the first two decades of the 20th century. Garner was the site of his first meetings as an evangelist.
Linda Upmeyer (born 1952) Iowa State Representative from the 12th District
Robert W. Keith, Ph.D. (born 1937), Professor of Otolaryngology/Audiology, Univ. of Cincinnati.  Editor-in-Chief, Ear and Hearing (Journal of the American Auditory Society), 1984-1992. Co-founding member and Past-President of the American Academy of Audiology.  Author of the central auditory processing disorder test batteries, SCAN-3:A and SCAN-3:C.  Some of his scholarly works are cited in Google Scholar at; Robert W. Keith
 William Henschen - William Henschen was born on July 11, 1893, in Garner.  He was an only child, and his father was a janitor at the Hancock County Court House.  Henschen graduated from Garner in 1911; there were 11 members in his class.  He went on to teach at a Hancock County school and attended Iowa State University where he majored in Civil Engineering. Henschen had saved over one million dollars in his lifetime, and he left that money to the students of Garner–Hayfield in the form of a scholarship for all graduates. Every student who graduates from Garner–Hayfield High School is given a scholarship in his name.  Because only the interest is paid out each year, and not the original principal, the scholarships will continue as long as there are G-H grads.  The first scholarship was given in 1970; it was $300 per student.  That amount has grown to over $4000 per student.  Henschen has left a legacy that has benefited many, many people in the small town of Garner. Source:  "William Henschen His Life and the Scholarship" Pamphlet created by Jennifer Reding and Denise Linneman
 J. W. Rayhons (born 1979) Rayhons Financial Solutions, Joshua Development - son of Steve Rayhons, is an entrepreneur and businessman currently living in Gilbert, Arizona.

See also

Hancock County Courthouse
St Paul Lutheran Church

References

External links

Garner, Iowa City government and community website
Garner Leader Local online and newsprint news source
City-Data Comprehensive statistical data and more about Garner

Cities in Iowa
Cities in Hancock County, Iowa
County seats in Iowa
Populated places established in 1870
1870 establishments in Iowa